Scatterbrain a collection of short stories, novel excerpts and essays by Larry Niven. It was published in 2003, as a sequel to N-Space and Playgrounds of the Mind.

Contents
Introduction: Where Do I Get My Crazy Ideas
Destiny's Road (Excerpt from the novel)
The Ringworld Throne (Excerpt from the novel)
The Woman in Del Ray Crater
Loki
Procrustes
Mars: Who Needs It? (Non-fiction for Space.com)
How to Save Civilization and Save a Little Money (Non-fiction for Space.com)
The Burning City (Excerpt from the novel, with Jerry Pournelle)
Saturn's Race (Excerpt from the novel, with Steven Barnes)
Ice and Mirrors (With Brenda Cooper)
Discussion with Brenda Cooper re: Ice and Mirrors
Smut Talk
Telepresence
Learning to Love the Space Station
Autograph Etiquette
Tabletop Fusion
Collaboration
Intercon Trip Report
Handicap
Did the Moon Move for You, Too?
Hugo Awards Anecdotes
Introduction to Pete Hamilton story Watching Trees Grow
Introductory material for Man-Kzin Wars II.
Canon for the Man-Kzin Wars
Epilogue: What I Tell Librarians

Short story collections by Larry Niven
2003 short story collections
Tor Books books